Jerry Moss Plaza is an outdoor plaza in the Los Angeles Music Center, in the U.S. state of California. Named after Jerry Moss, the plaza has hosted concerts, festivals, film screenings, galas, and dance parties. It has two large LED screens. The plaza was "newly refurbished" as of 2021.

References

External links 

 Jerry Moss Plaza at the Music Center

Downtown Los Angeles